Reese's Puffs (formerly Reese's Peanut Butter Puffs) is a corn-based breakfast cereal manufactured by General Mills inspired by Reese's Peanut Butter Cups. At its launch in May 1994 the cereal consisted of corn puffs flavored with chocolate and peanut butter. Later, the formula was revised to be a mixture of chocolate puffs and peanut butter puffs.

Artificial flavours and food coloring were removed in 2015 in response to consumer demand.

See also
 Reese's Peanut Butter Cups

References

General Mills cereals
Products introduced in 1994